Tempera is a painting medium.

Tempera may also refer to:

MT Tempera, a Finnish oil tanker
Tempera (horse), an American Thoroughbred racehorse

People with the surname
Vince Tempera (born 1946), Italian musician

See also
Tempura, a Japanese dish of seafood or vegetables
Tempra